Deirdre Delaney may refer to:

 Deirdre Delaney (actress), American television actress
 Deirdre Delaney (camogie) (born 1985), Irish camogie player